El Edén International Airport  is an international airport serving Armenia, the capital of the Quindío Department of Colombia. It handles domestic flights to Bogotá and Medellín and international flights to Fort Lauderdale, Florida.

Overview
Following Armenia's 25 January 1999 earthquake, the terminal had to be rebuilt after major seismic activity caused much of the building to collapse. During 2008 and 2009, the airport's runway was extended, the control tower's height was increased, and the terminal building was partly upgraded to include a new international gate and immigration area. The airport is now capable of receiving aircraft such as Boeing 737 and 727, Airbus A319 and A320, McDonnell Douglas MD-80 and Fokker 100.

The first international flight to land at El Edén International Airport was operated by Spirit Airlines on 13 November 2009 from Fort Lauderdale, USA.  As of May 2019, Spirit Airlines operates three times a week on Mondays, Wednesdays and Fridays from El Edén International to Hollywood International Airport.

Airlines and destinations 

The following airlines operate regular scheduled and charter flights at the airport:

See also
Transport in Colombia
List of airports in Colombia

References

External links 

El Edén Airport at OurAirports

El Edén Airport at Here WeGo

Airports in Colombia
Armenia, Colombia
Buildings and structures in Quindío Department